"Georgia on My Mind"' is a 1930 song written by Hoagy Carmichael and Stuart Gorrell, often associated with Ray Charles.

Georgia on My Mind may also refer to:

Georgia on My Mind (novelette), a science fiction novelette by Charles Sheffield published in 1993
"Georgia on My Mind" (Diagnosis Murder Episode), from the second season of the series
"Georgia on My Mind", an episode from the twelfth season of the ABC News program, What Would You Do?